Haviq District is a district (bakhsh) in Talesh County, Gilan Province, Iran. At the 2006 census, its population was 30,348, in 6,913 families.  The District has two cities: Haviq and Chubar.  The District has two rural districts (dehestan): Chubar Rural District and Haviq Rural District.

References 

Talesh County
Districts of Gilan Province